Mehringen is a former municipality in the district of Salzlandkreis, in Saxony-Anhalt, Germany. Since 1 January 2008, it has been part of the town of Aschersleben.

See also
Drohndorf
Freckleben

References

Former municipalities in Saxony-Anhalt
Aschersleben